The 18th Filmfare Awards were held on April 18, 1971, honouring the best in Hindi Cinema in the year 1970.

Pehchan led the ceremony with 9 nominations, followed by Do Raaste with 7 nominations and Khilona with 6 nominations.

Pehchan won 4 awards, including Best Supporting Actress (for Chand Usmani), thus becoming the most-awarded film at the ceremony.

Feroz Khan received dual nominations for Best Supporting Actor for his performances in Aadmi Aur Insaan and Safar, winning for the former.

Main Awards

Best Film
 Khilona 
Do Raaste 
Pehchan

Best Director
 Asit Sen – Safar 
Raj Khosla – Do Raaste
Sohanlal Kanwar – Pehchan

Best Actor
 Rajesh Khanna – Sachaa Jhutha 
Dilip Kumar – Gopi
Sanjeev Kumar – Khilona

Best Actress
 Mumtaz – Khilona 
Sharmila Tagore – Safar 
Waheeda Rehman – Khamoshi

Best Supporting Actor
 Feroz Khan – Aadmi Aur Insaan 
Feroz Khan – Safar
Prem Chopra – Himmat

Best Supporting Actress
 Chand Usmani – Pehchan 
Bindu – Do Raaste
Mumtaz – Aadmi Aur Insaan

Best Comic Actor
 I. S. Johar – Johnny Mera Naam 
Jagdeep – Khilona
Mehmood – Humjoli

Best Story
 Do Raaste – Chandrakant Kakodkar 
Khilona – Gulshan Nanda
Pehchan – Sachin Bhowmick

Best Screenplay
 Johnny Mera Naam – Vijay Anand

Best Dialogue
 Satyakam – Rajinder Singh Bedi

Best Music Director 
 Pehchan – Shankar-Jaikishan 
Do Raaste – Laxmikant–Pyarelal
Talaash – S.D. Burman

Best Lyricist
 Pehchan – Verma Malik for Sabse Bada Nadan 
Do Raaste – Anand Bakshi for Bindiya Chamkegi
Pehchan – Gopaldas Neeraj for Bas Yehi Apradh

Best Playback Singer, Male
 Pehchan – Mukesh for Sabse Bada Nadan 
Khilona – Mohammad Rafi for Khilona Jankar
Pehchan – Mukesh for Bas Yehi Apradh

Best Playback Singer, Female
 Jahan Pyar Mile – Sharda for Baat Zara 
Do Raaste – Lata Mangeshkar for Bindiya Chamkegi
Johnny Mera Naam – Lata Mangeshkar for Babul Pyaare

Best Color Art Direction
 Talaash  – Shanti Das

Best B&W Art Direction
Not Awarded

Best B&W Cinematography
 Khamoshi  – Kamal Bose

Best Color Cinematography
 Heer Raanjha  – Jal Mistry

Best Editing
 Johnny Mera Naam  – Vijay Anand

Best Sound
 Talaash  – S.C. Bhambri

Critics' Awards

Best Film
 Uski Roti

Best Documentary
 Koodal

Biggest Winners
 Pehchan – 4/9
 Johnny Mera Naam – 3/4
 Talaash – 2/3
 Khilona – 2/6
Do Raaste – 1/7
Safar – 1/3

See also
 20th Filmfare Awards
 19th Filmfare Awards
 Filmfare Awards

References

 https://www.imdb.com/event/ev0000245/1971/

Filmfare Awards
Filmfare
1971 in Indian cinema